Be 1 is a Belgian premium television channel, owned by BeTV.

History
Be 1 is the successor of Canal+ Belgique.

Organisation

Capital
The channel is owned 100% by the group BeTV.

Programmes
Be 1 broadcasts many programmes made by Canal+ France's:
 Le Grand Journal
 Les Guignols de l'info
 7 jours au Groland
 + clair
 Al Dente
 Fais pas le sorcier

Transmission
In a recent report by the Conseil supérieur de l'audiovisuel (CSA), said that Be 1 will stop broadcasting via the analogue network on 31 December 2007, because its contract linking it with RTBF, the owner of television transmitters in Belgium, ends on that date.
Although Be 1 could broadcast on digital terrestrial television in Belgium.

See also
 Canal+

External links 
 Official site of Be TV

Television channels in Belgium
Television channels and stations established in 2004
French-language television stations in Belgium
2004 establishments in Belgium